The International Competition for Young Pianists in Memory of Vladimir Horowitz is a biennial international piano competition in Kyiv, Ukraine. It was founded in 1995 to honor pianist Vladimir Horowitz .

Winners

References 
 
World Federation of International Music Competitions
European Union of Music Competitions for Youth
Jeunesses Musicales International

Vladimir Horowitz
Piano competitions
Classical music in Ukraine
Music in Kyiv